Ollie Eugene Wilson (June 24, 1926 – July 4, 2002) was a defensive back in the National Football League. He was drafted in the sixth round of the 1947 NFL Draft by the Green Bay Packers and played two seasons with the team.

References

1926 births
2002 deaths
People from Arp, Texas
Players of American football from Texas
American football defensive backs
SMU Mustangs football players
Green Bay Packers players